Changying Global 100 Fantasty Park, also known as Changying Wonderland, is an under-construction amusement park in Haikou, Hainan, China.
 It is located around 12 km west of downtown Haikou, and around 7 km south of Haikou's west coast area.

References

Parks in Haikou
Amusement parks in China
Tourist attractions in Haikou